Fireman Frederick Davies GC (17 February 1913 – 23 August 1945) of the British National Fire Service was posthumously awarded the George Cross, the highest British (and Commonwealth) award for bravery out of combat.  He died attempting to rescue two girls from a fire in Harlesden.

The citation was published in a supplement to the London Gazette of 1 February 1946 (dated 5 February 1946), and read:

References

 Hissey, Terry – Come if ye Dare – The Civil Defence George Crosses, (2008), Civil Defence Assn

See also
List of George Cross recipients

1913 births
1945 deaths
Accidental deaths in London
British firefighters
British recipients of the George Cross
Deaths from fire
People from Shepherd's Bush